Mitra Aliabouzar (born 1986 in Tehran) is an Iranian activist from The Union for Secular Republic of Iran. She was a graduate student of medical engineering from Iran who was arrested on March 19, 2010, by the Ministry of Intelligence of Iran during Iranian Green Movement. Mitra, a master student in biomaterials at Sharif University of Technology, who is ranked 7th in the Iranian University Entrance Exam and a member of the Iran's National Elites Foundation, was transferred to Evin Prison on July 18, 2012, while on August 6 she has to defend her master thesis.
Mitra Aliabouzar was arrested for the first time on 10 February 2010 and was released 5 days later. She was arrested for the second time on 10 March 2010 and after 40 days of solitary confinement in unit 209 of Evin Prison, she was released on bail. Finally, she was transferred to Evin prison to serve a one-year sentence and was released after serving her sentence.

Mitra Aliabouzar was a member of Mehdi Karroubi's election campaign in the 2009 Iranian presidential election.

Immigration to United States
After her release from prison in 2013, Mitra Aliabouzar immigrated to the United States of America and received her PhD in mechanical engineering from the George Washington University and her post-doc from the University of Michigan. She is currently working as a research assistant professor at the University of Michigan.

Mitra Aliabouzar is a member of the political-executive board and the head of the women's and anti-discrimination committee of The Union for Secular Republic of Iran, which work as the opposition of the Islamic regime with the aim of establishing a secular and democratic government in Iran.

References

External links 
 Offizielle Webpage

1986 births
Living people
People from Tehran
Sharif University of Technology alumni
University of Michigan alumni
George Washington University alumni
Iranian expatriates in the United States
Prisoners and detainees of Iran
Iranian prisoners and detainees